Serge Benoist de Gastyne (July 27, 1930 – July 24, 1992) was an American composer and pianist born in Paris, France. After fighting with the French Resistance forces in World War II, he came to the United States and attended the University of Portland (Oregon), where he received a Bachelor of Arts degree in 1950. He took further studies at the Eastman School of Music and also at the University of Maryland, where he was awarded Master of Music and Doctor of Music Arts degrees.

Biography
Serge de Gastyne was born in Paris, France. Early in his teens, de Gastyne fought in the French Underground. He emigrated to the United States in 1947 where his dazzling piano-playing soon won him scholarship grants at the University of Portland and the Eastman School of Music. Between studies he sold encyclopedias, and earned enough to finance a cross-country trip by bus.

In 1952 he enlisted in the Air Force. He was assigned to the Composing and Arranging staff of the Air Force Band in Washington DC.

At Sampson Air Force Base near Rochester, New York (Major General Richard Lindsay commanding), he set out to compose a huge musical "panorama" celebrating the 50th anniversary of powered flight.

His musical compositions include symphonies, operas, and many pieces for band, voice and organ. He won awards for his compositions from the American Society of Composers, Authors and Publishers (ASCAP).

In 1968 he became a citizen of the United States. After studies at Eastman, he received a Masters and a Doctorate in music from the University of Maryland.

He taught music at Northern Virginia Community College while serving in the Air Force. He rose to the rank of master sergeant. After retirement, he moved to Gulfport, Mississippi, where he lived for three years before his death on July 24, 1992.

Serge was buried at Arlington National Cemetery.

The Serge de Gastyne That I remember
by Steve Mullany

From 1972-1974, I was privileged to know and study with Serge de Gastyne when he was head of the music department at Northern Virginia Community College. In those days, the "Music Department" of NOVACOCO was a one-room temporary building on stilts, equipped with a single upright piano and an air-conditioner, sitting in the middle of a parking lot behind a re-purposed warehouse that sheltered the rest of the college. No ivied walls here! The first time I met Serge, I found him with his sleeves rolled up tuning that piano. He was very much a hands-on kind of guy who relished the idea of creating a music department from the ground up that reflected his own ideas of what was important in music and life.
His classes were small. Only serious-minded students would be lured to such a Spartan setting, which turned out to be a great advantage. What developed was a rigorous, idiosyncratic, wide-ranging series of seminars on music that was perfectly suited to my situation and interests. Because of my years of listening to recordings, I came to his classes with much familiarity with classical music repertoire, but I had very little playing experience and almost no theoretical understanding. When Serge played music examples to illustrate a technical point, I was able to immediately connect his ideas to music that I knew and loved, so my progress in music theory and analysis was thrilling and speedy.

As a composer, Serge was decidedly tonal and conservative, and as a teacher, very respectful and knowledgable of tradition. However, because he was an accomplished composer, when he talked about other composers, he spoke of them with the familiarity of an intimate colleague, which produced wonderful insights into the thinking of otherwise distant figures of the past.

On one occasion, the subject was the uses of secondary dominant harmony. He was playing through the various examples from Piston's Harmony when he happened upon the opening of Mendelssohn's Wedding March from Midsummer Night's Dream, which, after the tonic fanfare, begins defiantly on the dominant seven of III. Serge paused for a moment and observed that he is often dismissive of Mendelssohn's music for its general drabness; but, any composer who could make something this outrageous sound OK in a wedding march had to be a genius!"

Because of our enthusiastic participation and love of learning, Serge grew very fond of our class, and he told us so. In fact, it was impossible for him to maintain a completely professorial distance from young people that he began to feel were closer to him than his own children. He invited us, on occasion, to musical parties at his house and the alcohol flowed as freely as the music. In this relaxed atmosphere, he shared many stories with us from his colorful past.
Although he was a war hero in the French Resistance, when he was studying in the US, the French government called him up for formal military service and he chose instead to join the US Air Force. The French government then confiscated his family's considerable land and property and made him persona non grata so he could never again return to France. This was an easy decision, however, since he saw many more interesting musical and professional opportunities in his adopted country.

While he was still in the Air Force in 1955, Serge was commissioned to write his 3rd Symphony by the Pittsburgh Symphony Orchestra. President Eisenhower, then the Commander in Chief, got wind of this and requested that a one-off recording be made of the premier, but music union rules did not allow the composer to acquire such a copy. According to Serge, his wife had a friend who worked in the White House, who smuggled the transcription disc out for one night so that Serge could make his own taped copy from it. (Serge played the tape for us, but the fidelity, as you can imagine, was pretty awful.)

Serge was the first person to tell me that I was a composer when I presented him with my first tender effort, a solo for alto recorder. This meant a lot to me, and set my course in music for the rest of my life.
 Serge de Gastyne was a teacher who mattered in this world. It is sad to say that his highly individual style of teaching would not be tolerated in today's politically-correct, socially-fastidious academies of higher learning. His passion for life and music was too big to be contained in a classroom that was not entirely his own.

Career
From 1953–1972, Serge was composer-in-residence with the U.S. Air Force Band and Orchestra in Washington, D.C. Concurrently he taught at Northern Virginia Community College, retiring in 1981. Serge was the Artistic Director and Resident Composer for the New Music Orchestra (Capitol Hill).

He wrote well over 100 original compositions, ranging from Chamber and Orchestral pieces (six commissioned Symphonies, a Tone Poem premiered by Leopold Stokowski, etc.), to many vocal works in different languages, compositions for band, chef d'oeuvre for organ and many mallet percussion pieces. He  also wrote for unusual instrumental combinations of the above, for example, including a significant part for organ in his Symphony No. 4 for Band, reading of poetry in his Symphony No. 6, etc.

Serge's Four Musical Moments  and Concerto for Trumpet were premiered by Emerson Head and Roy Hamlin Johnson, both professors of music at the University of Maryland at College Park. Emerson Head also premiered his Grand Duo Concertant at the University of Maryland, College Park.

His symphony, L'Ile Lumiere (Island of Light) was commissioned by Thor Johnson, Director of the Cincinnati Symphony, and performed by the orchestra in its 1956 season.

Serge was instrumental in the creation of the Music Department at the Bailey's Cross Roads campus of Northern Virginia Community College. He wrote seven symphonies as well as his Eclogae for soprano and orchestra.

Because of his professional position with the Air Force Symphony Orchestra in Washington, D.C. he is well known for his American Weekend March, which was commissioned by the American Weekend magazine.  In addition, he also completed or collaborated on countless arrangements during his time in the Air Force.

Serge played the French Romantic organ during his early childhood days in Paris, a symphonic sound that generates a blaze of color and majesty in his monumental composition for organ, Cantique de Joie. Serge exuded a generosity of spirit and ruthlessness in equal measure. He was open to share basic aesthetic tenets. In particular, Cantique de Joie displays a spiritual connection. He seems to have a foot in the next world – a creative colossus at the peak of his powers with a particular Catholic spirituality translated into a religious idiom.

Cantique de Joie, Opus 70, was dedicated to Peter Basch and performed by him at Notre Dame Cathedral in Paris, on the V/153 Cavaillé-Coll (modified) in 1973. He wrote of his experience playing there: "The most exciting part for me was the entrance of the pedal triplets mid-way, like a pile driver pumping its way forward, a determined thrust and support to the upperwork that was crashing/exploding, aided by the dissonant chords cutting through the texture with a volcanic bombardment to the victorious final spread. And, that huge organ wrapped itself around me, like a tiger, and I will never, ever forget the entrance of the bombarde division when the console and tribune floor began to vibrate, making me think that I would bring down the entire balcony."

Serge is the subject of a book about himself and his half brother, Guy Geller, during their time under the Nazi regime in France. The book, entitled Here I Am! was written by Serge's mother, Louise Norman, and is available at the Holocaust Museum (Washington, D.C) and on Amazon.

Selected works 
 All/ Roverscio, for Medium Voice, Piano
 Aria Tenebrosa (Psalm 130), for Medium Voice and piano
 Bachiana (Nagyapa), for Piano
 Bist Du Bei Mir, for Choir
 Black is the Color of My True Love's Hair, for Male Chorus
 Cantique de Joie, for Organ
 Champ-De-Mars, for Piano
 Chanson Innocente (op.66), lyrics by e,e, cummings, for A Cappella Choir
 Chopiniana, for Piano
 I Notre Dame
 II Benison I
 III Benison II
 IV Sans-Souci
 Chopiniana II (B.G. 47), for Piano
 Benison III
 Del Fine
 L'Aiglon
 Schubertiade
 Csak Egy Kisl ny Szentirmay, for Piano
 Delaware Beethoven, for Medium Voice
 Delphic Hymn, for Medium Voice and Organ
 Deux Chansons Francaises, for Medium Voice, Flute and Vibraharp
 A La Forest De Gastine, Lyrics by Pierre Ronsard,
 Il Bacio, Lyrics by Paul Verlaine
 Etude (on a folk-song), for Piano
 Etude Folklorique, for Piano
 Etudiante, for Piano
 Exercise en Thorme, for Organ
 Fantasmagorie, for Piano
 La Caraffe de Plomb (after Palestrina)', for Medium Voice and Piano
 Larghetto, for Medium Voice
 L'Íle Lumíère, for Medium Voice and Organ
 maggie and milly and molly and may, for Choir and Piano
 may my heart, for Medium Voice and Piano
 Menuet Très Antique, for Vibraharp
 Noel (for little children), for Choir and Flute
 Oak Hill (Op. 15-3G), for Piano
 Petite Rêverie, for Piano
 Prélude, for Piano
 Proem, for Piano
 Quodlibet, for Soprano, Tenor, and Bass, A Cappella
 Rondel, for Medium Voice and Vibraharp
 Seven Bachianas, for Voice, Viola and Piano
 Speranza (Derry Air – Schubertiade XC), for Medium Voice and Piano
 String Quartet, Op. 67, No. 1
 Tres Morillas (Three Young Maidens), for High Voice and Piano
 Trittico Religioso, for Organ
 Two Elegies, for Medium Voice and Piano
 The Last Words The Sleeper of the Valley Vergiss-Mein-Nicht'', for Medium Voice and Piano

References

External links
 / Publication data for Cantique de Joie

1930 births
1992 deaths
French emigrants to the United States
American male composers
American male organists
Musicians from Paris
United States Air Force non-commissioned officers
Burials at Arlington National Cemetery
20th-century American composers
20th-century American pianists
20th-century organists
American male pianists
20th-century American male musicians
American organists